Justin Fox (born 1964) is an American financial journalist.

Justin Fox may also refer to:

 Justin Fox (musician) (born 1979), lead vocalist for the American band Dishwalla
 Justin D. Fox (born 1967), South African author, photojournalist, lecturer and editor

See also
 Justin Foxton (1849–1916), Australian politician, barrister and soldier